Elections to Limavady Borough Council were held on 21 May 1997 on the same day as the other Northern Irish local government elections. The election used three district electoral areas to elect a total of 15 councillors.

There was no change from the prior election.

Election results

Note: "Votes" are the first preference votes.

Districts summary

|- class="unsortable" align="centre"
!rowspan=2 align="left"|Ward
! % 
!Cllrs
! % 
!Cllrs
! %
!Cllrs
! %
!Cllrs
! % 
!Cllrs
!rowspan=2|TotalCllrs
|- class="unsortable" align="center"
!colspan=2 bgcolor="" | SDLP
!colspan=2 bgcolor="" | UUP
!colspan=2 bgcolor="" | DUP
!colspan=2 bgcolor="" | Sinn Féin
!colspan=2 bgcolor="white"| Others
|-
|align="left"|Bellarena
|bgcolor="#99FF66"|53.1
|bgcolor="#99FF66"|3
|36.6
|2
|10.3
|0
|0.0
|0
|0.0
|0
|5
|-
|align="left"|Benbradagh
|34.8
|2
|bgcolor="40BFF5"|35.4
|bgcolor="40BFF5"|2
|0.0
|0
|29.8
|1
|0.0
|0
|5
|-
|align="left"|Limavady Town
|33.1
|2
|bgcolor="40BFF5"|43.1
|bgcolor="40BFF5"|2
|21.9
|1
|0.0
|0
|1.9
|0
|5
|-
|- class="unsortable" class="sortbottom" style="background:#C9C9C9"
|align="left"| Total
|40.3
|7
|38.5
|6
|11.1
|1
|9.5
|1
|0.6
|0
|15
|-
|}

District results

Bellarena

1993: 3 x SDLP, 2 x UUP
1997: 3 x SDLP, 2 x UUP
1993-1997 Change: No change

Benbradagh

1993: 2 x UUP, 2 x SDLP, 1 x Sinn Féin
1997: 2 x UUP, 2 x SDLP, 1 x Sinn Féin
1993-1997 Change: No change

{{STV Election box candidate2|
 |party =      Sinn Féin
 |candidate =  Malachy O'Kane
 |count1 =     ''876 |percentage = 20.96%
 |count2 =      
 |count3 =      
}}

Limavady Town1993: 2 x UUP, 2 x SDLP, 1 x DUP1997: 2 x UUP, 2 x SDLP, 1 x DUP1993-1997 Change:''' No change

References

Limavady Borough Council elections
Limavady